David Joseph Solomona (born 26 January 1978) is a former professional rugby league footballer, who last played for the Warrington Wolves in the Super League. He was regularly amongst the top off-loaders in the competition.

Background
Solomona was born in Auckland, New Zealand and is of Samoan and Egyptian descent. He attended St. Paul's College, Auckland, a school known for consistently producing the best rugby league team in the national secondary school competition.

National Rugby League
Solomona started his career in Australia with the Sydney City Roosters making his first grade debut in round 16 of the 1999 NRL season against Melbourne. He played from the interchange bench for the Roosters in their 2000 NRL grand final loss to the Brisbane Broncos. He played for Samoa in the 2000 Rugby League World Cup.

In 2001, Solomona signed for Parramatta.  He played 25 games for the club in the 2001 NRL season as the club were runaway Minor Premiers and set a number of point scoring records.  Solomona played for the Parramatta Eels from the interchange bench in their shock 2001 NRL Grand Final loss to the Newcastle Knights at Stadium Australia.

Super League
Solomona spent three years at Wakefield Trinity Wildcats (Heritage № 1217) where his skills helped keep them in the Super League. In 2004 he was named in the Super League Dream Team. He helped New Zealand to defeat Australia to win the 2005 Rugby League Tri Nations tournament.

Solomona signed for the Bradford Bulls on 24 October 2006 for the 2007 season. He was the Bulls only ever-present player in 2007, making 32 appearances in his first year at the club. Blessed with tremendous ball handling skills he also has the ability to score tries himself and he scored 14 tries in 2007, including a hat trick.

Solomona missed the first 5 games of 2008 due to injury picked up in pre-season. He again represented Samoa in the 2008 Rugby League World Cup.

Solomona played in the 2010 Challenge Cup Final victory over the Leeds Rhinos at Wembley Stadium.

Solomona continued to feature in the Warrington Wolves squad throughout the 2011 season. He was mainly brought on as a replacement making good use of his strength and ball handling skills to make in-roads into the opposing defence.
His tenure with the Warrington Wolves came to a close due to an injury he suffered in the 2012 season, causing him to retire before returning to Australia.

References

External links
Bradford Bulls profile
Richmond profile
Bradford sign David Solomona
Solomona tipped to be hot stuff
Stars might turn out for Toa Samoa

1978 births
Living people
Bradford Bulls players
Junior Kiwis players
New Zealand national rugby league team players
New Zealand sportspeople of Samoan descent
New Zealand rugby league players
New Zealand expatriate sportspeople in England
Parramatta Eels players
People educated at St Paul's College, Auckland
Richmond Bulldogs players
Rugby league players from Auckland
Rugby league props
Rugby league second-rows
Samoa national rugby league team players
Samoan sportspeople
David
Sydney Roosters players
Wakefield Trinity players
Warrington Wolves players